Saiq is a town in the region Ad Dakhiliyah, in northeastern Oman. It has its own airport, Saiq Airport.

Climate
Saiq has a cold semi-arid climate (Köppen climate classification: BSk), with very warm summers and cool winters. Precipitation is higher, and temperatures are lower, than in many other towns in Oman due to its high altitude in the Al Hajar Mountains.

References

Populated places in Oman
Ad Dakhiliyah Governorate